James Parker  (1714 – July 2, 1770) was a colonial American printer, publisher, and postmaster. He published a wide variety of materials, including newspapers, government documents, magazines, and almanacs. He was a journalist in the provinces of New Jersey, New York, and Connecticut and owned several printing businesses in his lifetime. Parker worked closely with Benjamin Franklin in the printing trade, and Franklin even financed some of Parker's businesses as a silent partner. 

Parker was considered a better printer than William Bradford or Benjamin Franklin in the American Thirteen Colonies at the time. He established the first newspaper in the province of Connecticut and founded the first newspaper in New Jersey. He set up the first permanent print shop in province of New Jersey and was a printer for Yale College. Parker also was the general manager of the first public library organized in New York City.

Early life

Parker was born in 1714 in Woodbridge Township, New Jersey. His father was Samuel Parker, a cooper, and his mother was Jana Inglis, an Innkeeper. He was the grandson of Elisha Parker of Barnstable, Massachusetts, who moved to New Jersey with his wife Elizabeth Hinckley. Parker's father died when he was eleven years old. He apprenticed himself when he was 13 years old on a servant indenture on January 1, 1727, for eight years to William Bradford, a colonial printer in New York City. The agreement terms were that Bradford was to feed and provide for Parker in exchange for labor the boy would do. Bradford was also to train Parker the skills of the printing trade. 

Parker became a liability instead of an asset for Bradford when there was little printing work available. He decided in April 1733 to sell the remaining 21 months left on Parker's servant indenture and advertised the sale of his indenture. Parker ran away on May 17 before he had a chance to sell the remaining indenture. He advertised a reward for Parker's capture in his New-York Gazette newspaper. The runaway ad described the fugitive as "an Apprentice lad....by trade a Printer, aged about 19 years; he is of a fresh Completion with short yellowish hair." A reward was offered, which was doubled a short time later.

Mid-life 

Parker ultimately went to Philadelphia and started working for Benjamin Franklin as a journeyman in June 1733. Franklin persuaded him to return to the province of New York to fulfill his servant indenture agreement with Bradford, because of the double reward offered printed in Philadelphia's American Mercury on June 21, 1733. After completing the terms with penalties, Parker returned to Philadelphia, where he lived with Franklin for some eight years. Franklin saw talent in Parker and in 1741 he financed Parker, as a silent partner, in setting up his own printing business in New York City with a six-year franchise agreement. Franklin provided printing equipment, a press, an assortment of types, and also agreed to cover a third of the company's maintenance costs, in exchange for a third of the profits. 

Parker saw his new print shop as an opportunity to take over the business monopoly of the seventy year old Bradford in the province of New York. His new newspaper was called the New-York Gazette and Weekly Post-Boy, and the twenty-eight-year-old started publishing the third newspaper in New York City on January 4, 1743. As the circulation grew it gained a good share of Bradford's subscribers. Parker eventually became the official printer for both the King of England and the government of New York province, succeeding Bradford on December 1, 1743.

Parker wished to expand his business opportunities, so in February 1745 requested from the Common Council of New York City to become Keeper of the Library. The Corporation Library had already been established back in 1730 and had librarians over time, however the last librarian ended his term in 1742 and no replacement had come about. The existing library organization was serving the city poorly and not used much.  Parker proposed to organize the books, make a catalog of them, and set up a rental system for books that would be his pay. He agreed to replace or repair books and be available one day a week at the library. The Council agreed with his terms, and he became then the general manager of the first public library in New York City. In the autumn of 1746, as the library director, he established a system of circulation and fines. He also printed a catalogue of the library books that could be borrowed by the public.  
thumb|upright 1.0|
In 1747 Governor George Clinton  instructed  Parker, who at this time was New York's official printer, to omit certain objectionable material from the Assembly's proceedings. Parker thought the move would prove to be a serious attack to the idea of "Liberty of the Press," and refused to follow Clinton's directive. Taking the matter one step further he also inserted the objectionable material in his New-York Gazette.

Parker printed an enlarged version of the Conductor Generals in 1749 which was a work of outlining government officials duties and powers of justices of the peace, sheriffs, and coroners and was popular for many years among these government employees. It was originally published in Philadelphia by Andrew Bradford in 1722 and reprinted five times after Parker's death, being popular until the end of the century.

In 1751 Parker decided to go back to Woodbridge to set up a print shop. At the time, the province of New Jersey had two capitals. The capital for what had historically been East Jersey was at Perth Amboy, New Jersey; the capital for West Jersey was at Burlington, New Jersey. When people from Perth Amboy needed to have printing jobs done, they went to New York City, but the people from Burlington went to Philadelphia, since that city was more convenient for them. Parker's new Woodbridge printing office was close to Perth Amboy, so he offered his printing services to those in the eastern part of the New Jersey province and western part of the New York province. Parker's Woodbridge printing office became the first permanent print shop in New Jersey.

Works 
Parker established the first newspaper in the province of Connecticut, the Connecticut Gazette (April 12, 1755). At that time, he took William Goddard as an apprentice for a six year period of time. Goddard, using Parker's press, would later establish and print The Constitutional Courant, the first newspaper in New Jersey, in response to the Stamp Act of 1765. Parks hired a post rider to deliver the newspaper to outlying areas between New Haven and Hartford including Wallingford, Durham, Middletown and Wethersfield, Connecticut. He was a journalist in the provinces of New Jersey, New York, and Connecticut and had several printing businesses in his lifetime. 

Parker was also a printer for Yale College in Connecticut in the mid-eighteenth century. One of his first works for them, ordered in December 1754, was the laws of the college, written in Latin. In addition to publishing newspapers and official government documents, he also published magazines, poetry, fiction, history, science, almanacs, and religious material. He printed in New York City the Independent Reflector in 1752, a weekly magazine with moral and political essays. In 1753, another similar magazine titled the Occasional Reverberator and another in 1754 titled the Instructor. In 1755, he published a political magazine titled John Englishman.  

 The Votes and Proceedings of the General Assembly of the Province of New Jersey (April 17, 1754 – June 21, 1754)
 Independent Reflector (1752–53), edited by William Livingston
 Occasional Reverberator (1753), four issues
 John Englishman (1755), ten issues April 9 to July 5
 Instructor (1755), ten issues March 6 to May 8
 New American Magazine (1758–60), edited by Samuel Nevill 
 History of New Jersey (1765), written by Judge Samuel Smith.

Personal life 

Parker's parents were Samuel Parker and Jana Inglis. His father, a cooper by trade, died when James was young. His mother, Jana, who owned and operated an Inn in Woodbridge, was thought to have been married three times. Before marrying Parker, she had a son by William Paschal, also named William (half-brother to James). Her second marriage to Samuel Parker gave issue to four sons, Samuel Jr, John, James, and Elisha. After Samuel's death she married Nathaniel Paine. Parker married Mary Ballareau and they had two children, Samuel Franklin and Jane Ballareau. Samuel took over his father's print business when he became of age. In 1768, after the death his brother Elisha, Parker took responsibility for the support of Elisha's widow and 8 children. 

During his life, Parker had a variety of civic and community interests. He was the captain of a troop of horse guards in Woodbridge, a church member lay reader, and both comptroller and postmaster of the general post-offices of the British colonies, the latter jointly with John Holt. He also became judge of the court of common pleas of Middlesex County, New Jersey. In his day Parker was considered a better printer than William Bradford or Benjamin Franklin in the American Thirteen Colonies.

Later life and death 

Parker was the government public printer for the province of New Jersey in 1758. He had several controversial issues during the tenure as the government public printer of New York and New Jersey. He was brought before the grand jury for printing a Speech of an Indian of which he publicly apologized later.  He was put under arrest for printing an article on affairs in Ulster County and Orange County, New York. In 1770, Parker printed a controversial paper authored by Sons of Liberty leader Alexander McDougall for which he was arrested, however he died shortly thereafter before the settling of the case. The handbill To the Betrayed Inhabitants of New York spoke against the Stamp Act of 1765 as an illegal British tax on colonial printed material and Parker was arrested for seditious libel.

In January 1753, Parker entered into a partnership in New York with William Weyman, and established the firm of Parker & Weyman, where Parker conducted the printing operations while Weyman tended to the business concerns of the firm. They published a newspaper, several books, and printed for the government. Their newspaper had a wide circulation, the profits of which allowed them to invest in some property. In 1755 Parker purchased the press and types previously owned by John Peter Zenger and opened a printing shop in New Haven, and formed another partnership with John Holt. Parker published an edition of the Yale laws in January 1755, which was the first book printed in New Haven.While a partner with Weyman, Parker resided for the greater part of this time at Woodbridge, and managed the printing operations there at his own accord. In January 1759, Parker and Weyman dissolved their partnership.

Parker acted as Franklin's agent in the Philadelphia business of Franklin & Hall when Franklin went to Europe. His New York printing business was handed down to his nephew Samuel Parker in February 1759. Holt was the manager of the Connecticut Gazette and he ultimately took over the business in 1760. Towards the end of Parker's life, many of his business partners took advantage of his poor health and directed his fortune to themselves, and he became known as the "weeping philosopher" for not understanding this. Parker suffered many years from gout, and died at a friend's house in Burlington, New Jersey, July 2, 1770. Although he was Episcopalian, he was buried near his parents in the First Presbyterian churchyard in Woodbridge.

See also 
 List of early American publishers and printers
 William Hunter (publisher)
 William Parks (publisher)
 Joseph Royle (publisher)

References

Bibliography 

 

 

 

 

 

 

 

 

 

 

 

 

 

 

 

 

1714 births
1770 deaths
American postmasters
18th-century publishers (people)
People from Woodbridge Township, New Jersey
Burials in New Jersey
People of colonial New Jersey
Apprentices of Benjamin Franklin
Colonial American printers